The P-90 (sometimes written P90) is a single coil electric guitar pickup produced by Gibson since 1946. Gibson is still producing P-90s, and there are outside companies that manufacture replacement versions. Compared to other single coil designs, such as the ubiquitous Fender single coil, the bobbin for a P-90 is wider but shorter. The Fender style single coil is wound in a taller bobbin, but the wires are closer to the individual poles.  This makes the P-90 produce a different type of tone, somewhat warmer with less edge and brightness. As with other single-coil pickups, the P-90 is subject to mains hum unless some form of hum cancellation is used.

History 
Around 1940, Gibson offered a new bridge pickup cased in metal for the ES-100/125 series as an alternative to the classic Charlie Christian pickup.

Officially, P-90 pickups were introduced in 1946, when Gibson resumed guitar production after World War II. The name refers to the part number as designated by Gibson. They were initially used to replace Gibson's original "bar" or "blade" pickup, also known as the Charlie Christian pickup, on models such as the ES-150, and by the end of the 1940s it was the standard pickup on all models. The soap bar-style P-90 debuted with the Les Paul electric guitar  in 1952.

The P-90's reign as the Gibson standard pickup was short-lived, as a new design of pickup, the humbucker, was introduced in 1957. Equipped with double coils, the new pickup boasted greater output and less hum, although with less high end response. This new pickup, occasionally named PAF (or Patent Applied For), very quickly took over as the preferred choice for all Gibson models, relegating the P-90 to budget models such as the ES-330, the Les Paul Junior and Special, and the SG Junior and Special, such as those used by Pete Townshend and Carlos Santana. This trend continued throughout the 1960s and particularly in the early 1970s, where the P-90 all but disappeared from the entire Gibson range. By the 1970s, smaller single-coil pickups, mini-humbucking pickups, and uncovered humbucking pickups began replacing the P-90 pickups on Gibson's budget and lower-end models.

In 1968, Gibson reissued the original, single-cutaway Les Paul, one version being a Goldtop with P-90 pickups. In 1972, they produced Limited Edition reissues, called the "58 Reissue" though actually based on the 54 Goldtop Les Paul, with a stopbar tailpiece; and the 54 Custom, the "Black Beauty," equipped with a P-90 in the bridge and an Alnico 5 pickup at the neck. Total production of these guitars was quite small. In 1974, Gibson put the P-90 pickup in their Les Paul '55, a reissue of the Les Paul Special from that era. It was followed in 1976 by the Les Paul Special double-cutaway (DC) model and in 1978 by the Les Paul Pro (which had an ebony fingerboard with trapezoid inlays). Since the 1970s, the P-90 pickup has seen some success in various models in the Gibson line, mostly through reissues and custom versions of existing models. Currently it is featured most prominently on the Les Paul Faded Doublecut, and certain models in the Historic range.

In the early 1970s, punk rock guitarists such as Johnny Thunders of The New York Dolls began using Les Paul Juniors and Les Paul Specials equipped with P-90s because of the cutting overdriven sound and the inexpensive nature of the guitars. In both The Dolls and The Heartbreakers, Thunders influenced younger punk rock guitarists who adopted his look and choice of guitar. Mick Jones of The Clash and Steve Jones of The Sex Pistols both owned Les Paul Juniors, and the double-cutaway Junior became the first choice for punk rock guitarists. 
 
The P-90 was also marketed by Gibson in the 1970s as the "Laid Back" pickup, as part of a line of "named" pickups.

For the 2014 model year, the Les Paul Melody Maker featured a variant of the P-90 pickup called the P-90S, inspired by the original pickup of the Gibson ES-125. This variant possesses six rectangular Alnico-slug pole pieces with no individual height adjustment.

Varieties 
There are three major varieties of P-90 casing:

 Soap bar casing has a rectangular shape and the mounting screws are contained within the coil perimeter, positioned between the pole pieces, between the second and third strings and between the fourth and fifth strings, thus creating an irregular and somewhat unusual pattern. Occasionally they are mistaken for pole pieces, thus sometimes the P-90 is erroneously said to have eight pole pieces. The soap bar nickname most probably comes from its shape and proportions, and that the first P-90s on the original Gibson Les Paul Model of 1952 were white.

 Dog ear is a casing type with extensions at both sides of pickup. These are extensions that hold the mounting screws. Dog-ear P-90 pickups were commonly mounted on Gibson's hollow-body guitars like the ES-330 and occasionally on solid-body models like the Les Paul Junior. The same pickups were also available on Epiphone models (since Gibson was building Epiphone guitars in the 1950s) and the design is best remembered for its appearance on the hollow body Epiphone Casino of the mid to late 1960s.

 Humbucker Casing To install a P-90 in a guitar routed for humbucker pickups (a Les Paul Standard for example), the installer must modify the existing rout in the body.  This may result in aesthetic issues, due to gaps between the body and hardware, or even structural problems, as is the case when re-routing the neck humbucker opening on a Gibson SG guitar. Because of this, pseudo P-90s in a humbucker-sized casing are common (see below).

Sound 
Being a single-coil design, the tone of a P-90 is somewhat brighter than a humbucker, though not quite as crisp and snappy as Fender's single-coil pickups. The tone therefore shares some of the single coil twang, but having large amounts of midrange and often described as “thick". The reason behind the tonal difference between P-90s and Fender single-coil pickups is due to construction methods. P-90s use bar magnets set under the polepieces, much like a humbucker, whereas Fender single-coils use rod magnets as the polepieces. Popular guitars that use or have the option of using P-90s are the Gibson SG, Gibson Les Paul, Ernie Ball Axis series and the Epiphone Casino. Fender Jazzmaster pickups are often confused with the P-90; however, their only similarity is cosmetic, since there are many significant visual, dimensional and electrical differences.

The placement of the guitar pickups by Gibson before World War II was such that they emphasised the treble response to compensate for the low frequencies of the electronics in the bass. The increased output and high end afforded by the P-90 design allowed the company to position the pickup closer to the neck.

All Gibson P-90 pickups (vintage and otherwise) were machine wound on Leesona coil winding machines, although their electrical specifications may vary slightly due to operator error. In common with many other modern pickup types, there are two versions of modern P-90: neck and bridge version. Their DC resistance tends to be around 8 kΩ. Early P-90 pickups made before approx 1974 were manufactured with no difference in the bridge and neck position and were interchangeable. After winding, pickups were hung on a rack holding twenty pickups and assembled according to the model of guitar they were to be used on (Soap-Bar or Dog Ear). Earlier pickups (around 1952) had Alnico 3 magnets, but in 1957 Gibson switched to Alnico 5.

Hum-canceling and side-by-side humbucker designs 

One negative aspect of the P-90 pickup is its susceptibility to 50 Hz / 60 Hz mains hum induced in its coil by external electromagnetic fields originating in mains-powered electrical appliances, motors, lighting ballasts and transformers, etc. This susceptibility is common to all single-coil pickup designs, but the P-90, having around 2,000 more turns of wire in its coil than Fender pickups, receives a relatively large amount of mains hum. Several manufacturers now make hum-canceling pickups that resemble the P-90 but most do not have a similar sound.

There are three types of hum canceling pickups that can fit inside a Soapbar P-90 cover:
 First generation Stacks (vertically stacked coils) such as Gibson's P-100 and Seymour Duncan Stacks. These invariably require a deep pickup cavity. 
 Sidewinders (1955 designed horizontal side-by-side coils) such as those produced by Gibson, Lace, Fralin and Mojotone. These compact examples install into standard pickup cavities.  
 New generation buffered vertical humbuckers from Kinman P-90 Hx (Patented). The Gen-3 versions also install into standard pickup cavities.

First generation hum-canceling Stacks such as Gibson P-100 and Seymour Duncan Stacks have two coils arranged to give the Humbucker effect, meaning there is a second identical coil below the main one and they share two bar magnets in common.  Hum is effectively cancelled since the coils are connected out of phase. However, as with all crude Stacks there is a large degree of magnetic coupling between the coils which cancels string signal right along with the hum. Manufacturers over-wind the coils to recover the output loss, but this introduces a second problem: excessive coil capacitance that robs the sound of dynamics, presence, and touch sensitivity. Despite contrary marketing claims these two design flaws/issues gave these types of pickups a bad reputation among musicians.

The Sidewinder, otherwise known as a "Center or Middle Point Humbucker" since there are two side-by-side coils and the six pole screws are positioned between the coils. The Sidewinder is the product of Heuristic (engineering) and originated by Gibson in the mid-1950's.  Nowadays it is used as an attempt to overcome the drawbacks of the crude stacked design and because its compact size conveniently does not require pickup cavities to be deepened, unlike crude Stacks which are far deeper. It does this with both coils reoriented from vertical to horizontal configuration but using a similar magnetic circuit to that of a P-90. Unlike stacked coils where common-mode string signals are canceled thereby reducing output level, output of Sidewinders is slightly better. Unfortunately, unlike a side-by-side humbucker, due to electro-magnetic shortcomings of the Sidewinder design a great loss of mutual inductance between the two coils exists which ostensibly means one coil produces most of the string signal output while the second coil is present just to cancel hum. This means over-winding with finer wire is still necessary to attain sufficient output and the maker faces a precarious balancing act of achieving sufficient output and avoiding excessive coil capacitance and thus Sidewinders generally can not match the high output of a regular P-90. Sonically, sidewinders sit somewhere between a regular P-90 and a stacked pickup. When played clean, they do not chime and they are not lush like a single coil P-90, but they are not nasal or completely lifeless either. The Sidewinder finds a place in over-driven sounds where a loss of sparkle and dynamics is less important than avoiding amplifying hum. These type of pickups, when put in a Soapbar cover, have the same outward appearance of P-90s but the insides are very different.

Examples of Sidewinders are Lace Holy Grail, Lindy Fralin, Gibson P-90H and the Quiet Coil by Mojotone, and although the magnets and magnet wire found in regular P-90s are present in the Quiet Coil, unlike a real P-90 which has a single coil, there are two coils. Mojotone claim their Quiet Coils attempt to match the inductance and resonant peak frequency of a true single coil P-90 but without the hum. However that is an objective of all competing Sidewinder P-90 pickups. The Sidewinder design allows less deviation from P-90 sound than crude Stacks. All Sidewinders avoid the need to modify the guitar with extra routing of the pickup cavity, unlike common Stacks and is a strong reason for the sudden explosion of Sidewinder pickups appearing in the market place circa 2018.

There is a fourth type of pickup sometimes found in a guitar ostensibly routed for P90's: the Mini-humbucker. The mini-humbucker, a pickup designed by Epiphone, was legally acquired by Gibson in the 1950's when they purchased Epiphone. The mini-humbucker is a two coil, adjustable pole, humbucking design that eliminates hum like a full size Humbucker. This conversion was accomplished by creating a new surround that fit the larger P90 body routing while providing mounting points and a reduced opening for the mini-humbucker. However, the only relationship between the mini-humbucker and the P90 pickup is the fact that the mini-humbucker can be mounted in a P90 rout when used with the aforementioned surround.
 
In later years, in response to a resurgence of popularity of the P-90, Gibson issued the P-100, a flawed, stacked, hum canceling version of the P-90 (see above). Gibson also made a newer noiseless P-90 called the H-90, which is found in Billie Joe Armstrong's Signature Les Paul Junior. The H-90 has two crudely stacked coils and Gibson erroneously claimed that it does not lose the sonic and feel characteristics of a P-90, however many players disagree, perhaps contributing to its lack of favor and use in other guitars.

References

External links 
 Electric guitar pickup analysis results, a massive load of data on various pickup models, obtained in UIUC Physics 406 "Physics of Music" course.
 All About P-90s

Guitar pickups
Gibson Brands